This is a list of finalists for the 1986 Archibald Prize for portraiture, listed by Artist and Title. As the images are copyright, an external link to an image has been listed where available.

See also 

 Previous year: List of Archibald Prize 1985 finalists
 Next year: List of Archibald Prize 1987 finalists
 List of Archibald Prize winners
 Lists of Archibald Prize finalists

References 

1986
Archibald
Archibald
Archibald Prize 1986
Archibald Prize 1986